The Apothecaries Act 1815 was an Act of the Parliament of the United Kingdom (citation 55 Geo.lll, c.194) with the long title "An Act for better regulating the Practice of Apothecaries throughout England and Wales". The Act introduced compulsory apprenticeship and formal qualifications for apothecaries, in modern terms general practitioners, under the license of the Society of Apothecaries. It was the beginning of regulation of the medical profession in the UK. The Act required instruction in anatomy, botany, chemistry, materia medica and "physic", in addition to six months' practical hospital experience.

Despite the Act, training of medical people in Britain remained disparate. Thomas Bonner, in part quoting M. Jeanne Peterson, notes that "The training of a practitioner in Britain in 1830 could vary all the way from classical university study at Oxford and Cambridge to a series of courses in a provincial hospital to 'broom-and-apron apprenticeship in an apothecary's shop'".

References

External links

United Kingdom Acts of Parliament 1815
Legal history of England
Medical regulation in the United Kingdom
History of medicine in the United Kingdom
Repealed United Kingdom Acts of Parliament